Wing and a Prayer, The Story of Carrier X is a 1944 war film.

Wing and a Prayer may also refer to:

Film and television
 A Wing and a Prayer (film), a 2015 television documentary film by Boaz Dvir
 A Wing and a Prayer, a 1998 TV film starring Claudia Christian
 Wing and a Prayer (TV series), a British television series starring Sean Arnold
 "A Wing and a Prayer" (Survival in the Sky), an episode of Survival in the Sky
 "A Wing and a Prayer" (Teenage Mutant Ninja Turtles), an episode of Teenage Mutant Ninja Turtles

Music
 A Wing and a Prayer, a 1987 album by Matthew Kelly
 "Wing and a Prayer", a song by the Bee Gees from One
 "Wing and a Prayer", a song by Camel from Breathless
 "Wing and a Prayer", a song by the Mission from Children

See also 
 Wing and a Prayer Fife and Drum Corps, an American disco group
 On a Wing and a Prayer, a 1992 album by Gerry Rafferty
 "Comin' In on a Wing and a Prayer", a 1943 song by The Song Spinners, and the origin of the phrase